Edward Graham McMinn (1843 - 30 May 1883) was a 19th-century Member of Parliament in the Waikato Region of New Zealand.

Edward Graham McMinn was born in the town of Antrim in Northern Ireland to Francis Joseph McMinn and Mary McMinn.

The "Greyite" (Liberal) vote was split.

He was found dead in his bed at Harapipi southwest of Hamilton, aged 40 years. He had been a staff-sergeant in Von Tempsky's Forest Rangers.

References

Year of birth missing
1883 deaths
Members of the New Zealand House of Representatives
New Zealand MPs for North Island electorates
19th-century New Zealand politicians
Unsuccessful candidates in the 1879 New Zealand general election